Evan Evans Settle (December 1, 1848 – November 16, 1899) was a U.S. Representative from Kentucky.

Born in Frankfort, Kentucky, Settle attended the public schools.
He was graduated from Louisville High School in June 1864.
He studied law.
He was admitted to the bar in 1870 and commenced practice in Owenton, Kentucky.

Settle was elected prosecuting attorney of Owen County in 1878, 1882, and 1886.
He resigned in 1887.
He served as member of the State house of representatives 1887–1890.
He served as delegate to the 1888 Democratic National Convention.

Settle was elected as a Democrat to the Fifty-fifth and Fifty-sixth Congresses and served from March 4, 1897, until his death in Owenton, Kentucky, November 16, 1899.
He was interred in Odd Fellows Cemetery.

See also

List of United States Congress members who died in office (1790–1899)

References

External links
 

1848 births
1899 deaths
Kentucky lawyers
Democratic Party members of the Kentucky House of Representatives
Politicians from Frankfort, Kentucky
Democratic Party members of the United States House of Representatives from Kentucky
19th-century American politicians
19th-century American lawyers